Arquímedes Euclides Caminero Ordóñez (born June 16, 1987) is a Dominican former professional baseball pitcher. He played in Major League Baseball (MLB) for the Pittsburgh Pirates, Miami Marlins, and Seattle Mariners. He also played in Nippon Professional Baseball (NPB) for the Yomiuri Giants.

Career

Florida/Miami Marlins
Prior to playing professionally, Caminero attended Colegio Buen Pastor in the Dominican Republic. He was signed by Marlins scout Fred Ferreira and began his professional career with the DSL Marlins in 2006, with whom he went 0–1 with a 7.36 ERA in 18 relief appearances. In 2007, again with the DSL Marlins, Caminero went 2–3 with a 2.83 ERA in 16 games (four starts), striking out 48 batters in 47 innings. He moved stateside for 2008, splitting the season between the GCL Marlins (14 games), Jamestown Jammers (six games) and Greensboro Grasshoppers (one game), going a combined 1–1 with a 2.60 ERA in 21 relief appearances, striking out 31 batters in 27 innings. In 2009, he pitched for the Jammers (15 games), Grasshoppers (10 games) and Jupiter Hammerheads (two games), posting a combined 3–1 record with a 5.53 ERA in 27 appearances, striking out 61 batters in 40 innings. In 2010, he pitched for the Grasshoppers and went 5–2 with a 3.01 ERA in 48 appearances, finishing 22 games and striking out 97 batters in 74 innings. From 2011 to 2012, he compiled a 1–0 record with 3 saves in 32 games. he had a 9.00 ERA in 2011 and a 1.64 ERA in 2012 with Jupiter and Jacksonville. He started the 2013 season with Jacksonville. His 2013 stats in the minor were a 3.48 ERA, a 1.01 WHIP, 69 strikeouts, and 6–2 record with 5 saves playing for both the Jacksonville Suns and the New Orleans Zephyrs.

The Marlins promoted Caminero to the major leagues on August 16, 2013. He made his Major League debut on the same day, throwing a scoreless inning while striking out one and hitting a batter. He made 3 more appearances before being sent to Triple A. He was recalled back on September 1 when rosters expanded. His 2013 pitching statistics with the Marlins were a 2.77 ERA, a 1.00 WHIP, 20 strikeouts, and 1 hold in 13 innings pitched. He started the 2014 season with the Marlins Triple A team, the New Orleans Zephyrs, but was called up when Jacob Turner was put on the DL with a shoulder injury. On April 21, after allowing a game-winning home run to Jayson Werth, he was sent back down to New Orleans. He was called back up in May, but only made one appearance before being sent back down. With the Marlins he has a 10.80 ERA, a 1.80 WHIP, 8 strikeouts, and a 0–1 record. His 2014 minor league stats are a 4.86 ERA, a 1.59 WHIP, 79 strikeouts, and a 4–1 record with 10 saves for New Orleans.

On January 28, 2015, Caminero was designated for assignment by the Marlins.

Pittsburgh Pirates
Caminero was traded to the Pittsburgh Pirates on February 4, 2015, in exchange for cash considerations. Caminero played in the major leagues for the Pirates in the 2015 and 2016 seasons.

Seattle Mariners
On August 6, 2016, Caminero was traded to the Seattle Mariners in exchange for a player to be named later and Future considerations. He was activated by the club on August 8. Caminero was released by the Mariners organization on December 16, 2016.

Yomiuri Giants
On December 16, 2016, Caminero's contract was sold to the Yomiuri Giants.

On December 17, 2016, Caminero signed with the Yomiuri Giants of Nippon Professional Baseball for a 1-year deal worth an estimated $1.15 million.

New York Mets
On January 3, 2019, Caminero signed a minor league deal with the New York Mets that included an invitation to spring training. He was released by the Mets on July 12, 2019.

Diablos Rojos del México
On July 15, 2019, Caminero signed with the Diablos Rojos del México of the Mexican League. Caminero did not play in a game in 2020 due to the cancellation of the Mexican League season because of the COVID-19 pandemic. On June 5, 2021, Caminero re-signed with the team for the 2021 season.

Post-playing career
On February 12, 2022, Caminero announced his retirement from professional baseball, and that he would be joining the Houston Astros organization as a minor league pitching instructor.

Name
Caminero is named for ancient Greek mathematicians Archimedes and Euclid. In an interview with the Miami Herald, Caminero said that his father "saw the names in an algebra book and liked them." Arquimedez Pozo, who played briefly in MLB in the mid-1990s, shares a similar first name.

References

External links
, or NPB

1987 births
Living people
Diablos Rojos del México players
Dominican Republic expatriate baseball players in Japan
Dominican Republic expatriate baseball players in Mexico
Dominican Republic expatriate baseball players in the United States
Dominican Summer League Marlins players
Greensboro Grasshoppers players
Gulf Coast Marlins players
Jacksonville Suns players
Jamestown Jammers players
Jupiter Hammerheads players
Leones del Escogido players
Major League Baseball players from the Dominican Republic
Major League Baseball pitchers
Mexican League baseball pitchers
Miami Marlins players
New Orleans Zephyrs players
Nippon Professional Baseball pitchers
Pittsburgh Pirates players
Seattle Mariners players
Sportspeople from Santo Domingo
Syracuse Mets players
Toros del Este players
Yomiuri Giants players